Le Peuchapatte is a municipality in the district of Franches-Montagnes in the canton of Jura in Switzerland.  On 1 January 2009, the formerly independent municipality of Le Peuchapatte merged into the municipality of Muriaux.

References

Former municipalities of the canton of Jura